Walhalla is a city in the foothills of the Blue Ridge Mountains in Oconee County, South Carolina, United States. Designated in 1868 as the county seat, it lies within the area of the Blue Ridge Escarpment, an area of transition between mountains and piedmont, and contains numerous waterfalls.

This European-American city was founded after Indian Removal of the Cherokee in 1838. Early residents were predominantly German immigrants who had been refugees from the German revolutions of 1848-1849. Some English and Scots-Irish farmers also settled here. During the Reconstruction era, when Oconee County was organized in 1868, the state legislature designated Walhalla as its county seat. 

While the population was 4,263 at the 2010 census, "Walhalla" is used both colloquially and practically to refer to a larger area than is within city limits, often being expanded to the whole 29691 zip code. This larger area has a higher, more spread-out population. The current mayor of Walhalla is Danny Edwards.

History

The German Colonization Society of Charleston was founded in 1848 to aid a wave of immigrants from the failures of the German revolutions of 1848-1849 and settle them in upstate; in the aftermath, numerous liberal merchants and farmers immigrated to the United States. Society trustees including General John A. Wagener, Claus Bullwinkel, John C. Henckel, Jacob Schroder, and Christopher F. Seeba bought  of land for $27,000 from Reverend Joseph Grisham of West Union in the Pickens District on December 24, 1849, to support German settlement in this area.

As mostly political refugees, the German colonists named their settlement Valhalla, in reference to the afterlife in Norse Mythology where warriors would go if selected to fight during Ragnarök. The Germans had sailed from the port of Hamburg, Germany to Charleston. Many were from Bavaria, and the ship also carried some English, Scots and Irish immigrants. 

When Oconee County was organized in 1868, Walhalla was selected as the county seat.

Ellicott Rock, Keil Farm, Oconee County Cage, Oconee Station and Richards House, St. John's Lutheran Church, Stumphouse Tunnel Complex, and Walhalla Graded School are natural formations and structures in Walhalla that have been listed on the National Register of Historic Places.

Geography
Walhalla is located at  (34.767263, -83.064321). The city developed in the northwestern part of the state near the Georgia and North Carolina borders. South Carolina Highway 28 and South Carolina Highway 183 intersect here.  The small town of West Union borders Walhalla to the east.

The town is built mostly upon granite rock. Near some minor faults, it has been subject to small and infrequent earthquakes. The last nearby earthquake had its epicenter in Newry, South Carolina, and occurred at 7:42 am EDT on May 19, 1971. The earthquake had an intensity of VI (strong) in Newry as measured by the Mercalli intensity scale. The cause of the Newry quake was likely a slippage of the Brevard Fault and other faults in the area, aided by the immense weight of the man-made Lake Keowee, created by the Keowee Dam.

The Stumphouse Mountain Tunnel is located near Walhalla.

Climate

Demographics

2020 census

As of the 2020 United States census, there were 4,072 people, 1,668 households, and 1,202 families residing in the city.

2000 census
As of the census of 2000, there were 3,801 people, 1,558 households, and 1,028 families residing in the city. The population density was 1,023.8 people per square mile (395.6/km2). There were 1,705 housing units at an average density of 459.2 per square mile (177.4/km2). The racial makeup of the city was 83.19% White, 15.35% Hispanic (of any race), 6.92% African American, 0.32% Native American, 0.32% Asian, 0.18% Pacific Islander, 1.42% from two or more races, and 7.66% other races.

There were 1,558 households, out of which 30.9% had children under the age of 18 living with them, 45.2% were married couples living together, 16.7% had a female householder with no husband present, and 34.0% were non-families. 30.9% of all households were made up of individuals, and 15.6% had someone living alone who was 65 years of age or older. The average household size was 2.40 and the average family size was 2.98.

In the city, the population was spread out, with 25.7% under the age of 18, 8.3% from 18 to 24, 27.7% from 25 to 44, 22.5% from 45 to 64, and 15.7% who were 65 years of age or older. The median age was 36 years. For every 100 females, there were 91.6 males. For every 100 females age 18 and over, there were 82.8 males.

The median income for a household in the city was $29,063, and the median income for a family was $34,184. Males had a median income of $28,445 versus $21,106 for females. The per capita income for the city was $15,691. About 14.1% of families and 17.2% of the population were below the poverty line, including 21.2% of those under age 18 and 15.0% of those age 65 or over.

Education
Walhalla has a lending library, a branch of the Oconee County Public Library. It is also home to Walhalla Middle School and James M. Brown Elementary School. Outside of city limits, there is also Walhalla High School and Walhalla Elementary School.

Arts and culture
Due to its German heritage, Walhalla established an annual Oktoberfest celebration. It begins on the third Friday of October each year.  The festival takes place on Main Street in Walhalla (Hwy 28) and on the city's Sertoma Field, located between the middle school and downtown (Hwy 183).  The festival includes art and craft vendors, music, dancing, specialty food vendors, carnival rides, and other festive activities.

Notable people
 John C. Portman Jr., architect
 Cornelia Strong, mathematician and astronomer
 Thomas C. Alexander, president of the South Carolina State Senate
 Dutch Mantell, professional wrestler

References

External links

 City of Walhalla
 Oconee County SC Chamber of Commerce
 Walhalla SC Information

Cities in South Carolina
County seats in South Carolina
German-American culture in South Carolina
Cities in Oconee County, South Carolina